Savannah Historic District may refer to:

Savannah Historic District (Savannah, Georgia), a National Historic Landmark district in Georgia
Central of Georgia Railroad: Savannah Shops and Terminal Facilities, Savannah, Georgia, a historic district listed on the NRHP in Georgia
Savannah Victorian Historic District, Savannah, Georgia, listed on the NRHP in Georgia
Savannah Avenue Historic District, Statesboro, Georgia, listed on the NRHP in Georgia
Savannah Historic District (Savannah, Tennessee), listed on the NRHP in Tennessee